Doricha is a genus of hummingbirds in the family Trochilidae.

Taxonomy
The genus Doricha was introduced in 1854 by the German naturalist Ludwig Reichenbach to accommodate the slender sheartail which is thus the type species. The genus name is that of Rhodopsis a celebrated Ancient Greek courtesan or hetaira.

The genus contains the following species:

References 

 
Taxonomy articles created by Polbot
Taxa named by Ludwig Reichenbach